The Country of the Campanelli (also known as Town of Bells) is a 1954 Italian-French comedy film directed by Jean Boyer and starring Sophia Loren. It is loosely based on the operetta "Il paese dei campanelli" by Carlo Lombardo.

The film's sets were designed by the art director Piero Filippone.

Plot 
A fraudulent travelling magician convinces the inhabitants of a town that they can make the bells ring whenever someone is unfaithful to another.

Cast 
 Sophia Loren as Bonbon
 Carlo Dapporto as Lt. La Gaffe
 Mario Riva as   Tarquinio  the Magician
 Alda Mangini as  Tenerina
 Luisella Beghi as  Candida
 Sergio Tofano as  Dr. Pott
 Achille Togliani as  René  
 Giuseppe Addobbati as    Tom   
 Rosita Pisano as  Annie 
 Alberto Talegalli as  Bruto
 Charles Fawcett as  Admiral
 Diana Dei as  Admiral's wife
 Alberto Sorrentino as The Stupid Sailor
 Riccardo Billi

References

External links

Italian comedy films
French comedy films
1954 comedy films
1954 films
Films directed by Jean Boyer
1950s French films
1950s Italian films